Matrix Gla protein (MGP) is member of a family of vitamin K2 dependent, Gla-containing proteins. MGP has a high affinity binding to calcium ions, similar to other Gla-containing proteins. The protein acts as an inhibitor of vascular mineralization and plays a role in bone organization.

MGP is found in a number of body tissues in mammals, birds, and fish. Its mRNA is present in bone, cartilage, heart, and kidney.

It is present in bone together with the related vitamin K2-dependent protein osteocalcin. In bone, its production is increased by vitamin D.

Genetics 
The MGP was linked to the short arm of chromosome 12 in 1990. Its mRNA sequence length is 585 bases long in humans.

Physiology 
MGP and osteocalcin are both calcium-binding proteins that may participate in the organisation of bone tissue. Both have glutamate residues that are post-translationally carboxylated by the enzyme gamma-glutamyl carboxylase in a reaction that requires Vitamin K hydroquinone.

Role in disease 
Abnormalities in the MGP gene have been linked with Keutel syndrome, a rare condition characterised by abnormal calcium deposition in cartilage, peripheral stenosis of the pulmonary artery, and midfacial hypoplasia.

Mice that lack MGP develop to term but die within two months as a result of arterial calcification which leads to blood-vessel rupture.

References

External links 
 

Extracellular matrix proteins
Genes on human chromosome 12
Glycoproteins